Propebela rufa, common name the red conelet, is a species of sea snail, a marine gastropod mollusk in the family Conidae, the cone snails and their allies.

Description
The length of the shell varies between 5 mm and 13 mm.

The shell contains 7 whorls. These are rather convex and very slightly shouldered. The 14 or 15 ribs are narrower than the interstices. The surface is covered with fine close revolving striae. The color of the shell is chocolate-brown, the ribs are lighter colored.

Distribution
This marine species occurs off the Southwest British Isles and Northern France.

References

 Nordsieck F. (1977). The Turridae of the European Seas. * La Conchiglia, Roma 131 pp.: page(s): 23; pl. 3 fig. 19
 de Kluijver, M. J.; Ingalsuo, S. S.; de Bruyne, R. H. (2000). Macrobenthos of the North Sea [CD-ROM]: 1. Keys to Mollusca and Brachiopoda. World Biodiversity Database CD-ROM Series. Expert Center for Taxonomic Identification (ETI): Amsterdam, The Netherlands. . 1 cd-rom.
 Gofas, S.; Le Renard, J.; Bouchet, P. (2001). Mollusca. in: Costello, M.J. et al. (eds), European Register of Marine Species: a check-list of the marine species in Europe and a bibliography of guides to their identification. Patrimoines Naturels. 50: 180–213
 Backeljau, T. (1986). Lijst van de recente mariene mollusken van België [List of the recent marine molluscs of Belgium]. Koninklijk Belgisch Instituut voor Natuurwetenschappen: Brussels, Belgium. 106 pp

External links
  Tucker, J.K. 2004 Catalog of recent and fossil turrids (Mollusca: Gastropoda). Zootaxa 682:1–1295.
 
 Montagu, George. (1803). Testacea Britannica or Natural History of British Shells, Marine, Land, and Fresh-Water, Including the Most Minute: Systematically Arranged and Embellished with Figures. J. White, London, Vol. 1, xxxvii + 291 pp. and Vol. 2, 293–606
 Jeffreys J. G. (1862-1869). British Conchology. London, van Voorst : Vol. 1: pp. CXIV + 341 [1862]. Vol. 2: pp. 479 [1864] Il frontrespizio reca la data 1863 ma in effetti pubblicato nel 1864. Vol. 3: pp. 394 [1865]. Vol. 4: pp. 487 [1867]. Vol. 5: pp. 259 [1869] 
 Forbes E.; Hanley S.C. (1848-1853). A history of British Mollusca and their shells. London, van Voorst. Vol. 1: i-lxxx [1853], 1-486 [1848], pl. A-W, AA-ZZ, AAA-ZZZ [dates uncertain]; Vol. 2: 1–480 [1 dec. 1849], 481-557 [1850]; Vol. 3: 1–320 [1850], 321-616 [1851]; Vol. 4: 1–300 [1852], pl. 1-114F
  Thompson, W. (1845). Additions to the fauna of Ireland, including descriptions of some apparently new species of Invertebrata. Annals and Magazine of Natural History. (1)15: 308–321, pl. 19
  Muller, Y. (2004). Faune et flore du littoral du Nord, du Pas-de-Calais et de la Belgique: inventaire. [Coastal fauna and flora of the Nord, Pas-de-Calais and Belgium: inventory]. Commission Régionale de Biologie Région Nord Pas-de-Calais: France. 307 pp

rufa
Gastropods described in 1803